Cook Islands competed in the 2010 Commonwealth Games held in Delhi, India, from 3 to 14 October 2010.

Their team of 31 athletes was announced on 11 September 2010.

Team Cook Islands at the 2010 Commonwealth Games

Athletics

Team Cook Islands consists of 2 athletes.

Patricia Taea, Tiraa Arere Jnr

Boxing

Team Cook Islands consists of 2 boxers.

Mathew Titoa, Jubilee Arama

Lawn Bowls

Team Cook Islands consists of 12 lawn bowls players.

Irene Tupuna, Mou Tokorangi, Nane Tere, Porea Elisa, Tai Jim, Kanny Vaile,
Denis Tokorangi, Tupou Okirua Tupou Farapotea, Kairua Takai, Vaine Henry, Vou Ina Tou, Peter Totoo

Men

Women

Netball

Team Cook Islands consists of 12 netball players.

Summary

Women
Kelani Matapo, Eleanor Taputu-Crombie, Luciana Matenga, Melissa Pittman, Celeste Brunton, Holly Solomona,
Ritua Ali'iva'a, Paula Te Huna, Curly George, Patty Te Huna, Noeline Davida, Ngatokorua Ellis Tuitupou

Pool B
 Goal percentage (G%) = 100 × GF/GA. Accurate to one decimal place.
 Highlighted teams advanced to the medal playoffs; other teams contested classification matches.

Tennis

Team Cook Islands consists of 1 player.

Brittany Teei

Weightlifting

Team Cook Islands consists of 2 weightlifters.

Luisa Peters, Sirla Pera

See also
 2010 Commonwealth Games

References

Nations at the 2010 Commonwealth Games
Cook Islands at the Commonwealth Games
2010 in Cook Islands sport